David John Colley (born 15 March 1947) is a former Australian cricketer who played in three Test matches and one One Day International in 1972.

Colley was a medium-fast bowler who played for New South Wales in the Sheffield Shield between 1969–70 and 1977–78. Chosen in the Australian team for the 1972 tour of England, Colley played in the first three Tests in the 1972 Ashes series. He opened the bowling in his first Test in Manchester and was first change bowler (Dennis Lillee and Bob Massie opened) in his second at Lord's. Massie took 16 wickets on debut in that match.

Playing in a List A match against Yorkshire at Bradford during the 1972 tour, Colley took 3/30, still a record for an Australian XI player in a List A match against Yorkshire.

References

Sources
 Warner, D. (ed.) (2017) The Yorkshire County Cricket Club Annual, Yorkshire County Cricket Club: Leeds.

1947 births
Living people
Australia Test cricketers
Australia One Day International cricketers
New South Wales cricketers
Australian cricketers
Cricketers from Sydney